The title of epi tou stratou ("the one in charge of the army") was a Byzantine military position attested during the 14th century.

History and functions 
According to the Book of Offices of Pseudo-Kodinos, written shortly after the mid-14th century, the epi tou stratou was a subaltern official of the megas domestikos, the commander-in-chief of the Byzantine army. On campaign, he scouted ahead of the army to find a suitable camping place, but his choice had to be confirmed by the megas domestikos. Most of the holders were military commanders, and their actual responsibilities were wider than implied by Pseudo-Kodinos; according to Rodolphe Guilland, in reality it appears that the office was simply conferred to give its holder a place in the imperial hierarchy.

In Pseudo-Kodinos' work, the office ranked 29th in the imperial hierarchy, between the prōtasēkrētis and the mystikos. His distinctive court dress consisted of a gold-brocaded hat (skiadion), a plain silk kabbadion tunic, and a domed skaranikon hat, of lemon-yellow silk and decorated with gold wire embroidery, and with a portrait of the emperor seated on a throne in front and another with the emperor on horseback on the rear. He bore no staff of office (dikanikion).

List of known epi tou stratou

References

Sources 
 
 
 
 
 

Byzantine military offices
Byzantine army